The Genesee Valley Transportation Company (GVT Rail), based in Batavia, New York, is a holding company for several short-line railroads located in New York and Pennsylvania.  Founded by Jeffrey Baxter, Charles Riedmiller, John Herbrand, Michael Thomas and David Monte Verde, GVT Rail has grown from a five-mile switching operation in Buffalo, New York, to a system network of greater than 300 miles.

Subsidiaries
Delaware-Lackawanna Railroad (1993)
Depew, Lancaster and Western Railroad (1989)
Falls Road Railroad (1996)
Genesee and Mohawk Valley Railroad (1992), leased to DL&W and MA&N
Lowville and Beaver River Railroad (1990)
Mohawk, Adirondack and Northern Railroad (1991)

External links
Genesee Valley Transportation Company

United States railroad holding companies
Companies based in New York (state)